Uttara North metro station (romanised: Uttora uttor metro steshen) is a metro station of the Dhaka Metro's MRT Line 6. This station is located in Uttara, a suburb of Dhaka. It was inaugurated on 29 December 2022.

History
The Uttara North Metro Station was constructed under "Package CP-03". The notification of application for construction of raised bridges for stations and railways was published on 30 June 2015 and the last date for submission of applications was 9 September 2015. Italian-Thai Development Public Company Limited gets work contract for "Package CP-03". The agreement document was sent to the ministry on 29 March 2016 for NBR investigation and law and parliamentary investigation. The signing ceremony for the agreement package was held on 3 May 2017 at the Pan Pacific Sonargaon Hotel in Dhaka. Construction work started on 2 August 2017. It was inaugurated on 29 December 2022 and opened on the next day.

Station

Station layout

Connectivity
Bangladesh Road Transport Corporation provides shuttle bus service from the station to House Building.

References

Metro stations in Uttara
Railway stations opened in 2022
2022 establishments in Bangladesh